Marinčev Grič is a small settlement in the hills west of Vrhnika in the Inner Carniola region of Slovenia.

References

External links
Marinčev Grič on Geopedia

Populated places in the Municipality of Vrhnika